Loïc Desriac (born 21 July 1989) is a French road cyclist, who currently rides for Vietnamese amateur team Dược Domesco Đồng Tháp.

Major results

2007
 1st  Overall Trophée Centre Morbihan
 1st Bernaudeau Junior
 4th Overall La Coupe du Président de la Ville de Grudziądz
2009
 1st Stage 1 Coupe des nations Ville Saguenay
 9th Paris–Tours Espoirs
2010
 4th Paris–Tours Espoirs
 9th Paris–Roubaix Espoirs
 10th Paris–Troyes
2011
 6th Grand Prix de la ville de Pérenchies
 9th Ronde van Vlaanderen U23
2012
 3rd Ronde Pévéloise
 5th Grand Prix de la Somme
 9th Chrono des Nations
 10th Overall Boucles de la Mayenne
2013
 8th Grand Prix de la Somme
2014
 1st Stage 3 Tour du Maroc
2015
 1st Mountains classification Tour de Hokkaido
 9th Overall Tour du Loir-et-Cher
2016
 5th Tour de Jakarta
 8th Overall Sharjah International Cycling Tour
 10th Overall Tour de Singkarak
2017
 4th Overall Tour de Singkarak
 4th Overall Tour de Ijen
2019
 2nd Overall Tour de Selangor
 4th Overall Tour de Siak
 4th Overall Tour de Singkarak

References

External links

1989 births
Living people
French male cyclists
Sportspeople from Villeneuve-Saint-Georges
Cyclists from Île-de-France